Kombo was a kingdom and later a chieftaincy in Gambia during the colonial period. Kombo was part of the Mali Empire and gained independence after its fall, and was then ruled by the Sambou Bainunka clan. Mansa Karapha Yalli Jatta became the first King of Kombo, after seeking help from the then independent Kaabu Empire to establish the Kingdom of Kombo, he married the daughter of the Bainuk Queen Wullending Jasseh of Sanyang who sits at Gunjur and took her to Busumbala. Mansa Karapha Yalli Jatta was from the Jatta (Lion) clan who claim ancestry from Sundiata Keita the first Emperor of the Mali Empire. Kombo was ruled by two families, the Jatta (Djatta) and Bojang (Bodian) clans, when one clan becomes Mansa, the other clan gets to choose the crown prince from their own clan and vice versa. From 1840-1855 Mansa Suling Jatta was the King of Kombo, he was killed in the Soninke-Marabout war, and most of the Jatta clan moved to other regions.

History 
There are relatively few mentions of Kombo in early Western literature on the Gambia, owing primarily to the fact that European visitors primarily visited the northern ports. In 1621, as English explorer Richard Jobson was about to leave the Gambia, he recorded that he met the King of Kombo, who welcomed him to the country. Portuguese explorer André Donelha wrote in 1625 that Kombo "produces much rice and is very beautiful." Another Portuguese explorer, Francisco de Lemos Coelho, wrote in 1688 that the King of Kombo was a Falupo, a general term meaning a Jola living near Casamance and that his village was the largest anywhere on the river. Coelho further wrote that Kombo had "much wax and rice" and that the King and his people were Pagan. In reality, he was a Mandinka while his mother was a Jola and he was a Muslim who probably was not very religious to attract European tourists and traders as many Muslims do today. The Masquerade Kumpo is named after Kombo.

An early map of the Gambia by the Courlanders in 1651 shows that they believed Kombo was an island. The Vermuyden map of 1661 and Leach's map of 1732 did not make this same error. Leach's map shows a number of locations, including Mansakunda (the King's town), a Muslim town to the east of the kingdom called Morakunda, and Kabata town. Francis Moore wrote in 1730 that the territory of Kombo spanned approximately 30 miles from Cape St. Mary's to the Kabata River.

There were originally seven villages of Kombo. namely Busumbala, Brikama, Yundum, Jamburu, Kafuta, Sanyang and Manduar.

King of Kombo 

The King of Kombo was known as 'Mansa'.

List of Kings of Kombo

References

References

Bibliography 

 Hughes, Arnold and Perfect, David. (2008). Historical Dictionary of The Gambia. Lanham: Scarecrow Press.
 Kea, Pamela J. (2010). Land, Labour and Entrustment: West African Female Farmers and the Politics of Difference. Boston: Brill.
 Gamble, David P. (2006). The South Bank of the Gambia: Places, People, and Population. Brisbane.

History of the Gambia
Former monarchies of Africa
Former countries in Africa
Precolonial kingdoms of the Gambia